N.K. Salil (born as Salil Kumar Naskar) is a Bengali film screenplay and story writer. He had also acted in a few movies.

Filmography

Story/screenplay/dialogue

Actor

References

External links 
 

Living people
Indian male screenwriters
Bengali screenwriters
Screenwriters from West Bengal
People from Howrah
Male actors from West Bengal
21st-century Indian male actors
Male actors in Bengali cinema
21st-century Indian dramatists and playwrights
21st-century Indian male writers
1971 births
21st-century Indian screenwriters